"Albatross" is a song by American heavy metal band Corrosion of Conformity. It was released as the lead single from the band's fourth studio album, Deliverance. Written by vocalist/guitarist Pepper Keenan and drummer Reed Mullin, "Albatross" was a hit on rock radio, peaking at No. 19 on the Billboard Mainstream Rock chart. The song is the band's highest charting single along with "Clean My Wounds", which also peaked at No. 19.

Background
"Albatross" was the first song recorded for Deliverance and the first song the band had written after the exit of vocalist Karl Agell. In a departure from previous COC songs, "Albatross" has a strong classic rock influence, especially the Lynyrd Skynyrd-style guitar outro. Of the style change, vocalist Pepper Keenan said, "The way we were thinking back then, the hardcore thing was getting so stale. It seemed that everyone was doin' the same fuckin' thing, and for us to write the song 'The Albatross' felt more punk rock than anything anyone was doing at the time. People were pissed off at us. But it finally felt real again."

Musical style
In his review of the album, AllMusic reviewer Eduardo Rivadavia referred to the song as a "slower, groovier number".

Track listing
Maxi single

European single

12" single

American promo single

Use in other media
"Albatross" was featured in the 2009 video game Guitar Hero: Metallica.

References

External links
 Official music video on YouTube

1994 songs
1994 singles
Columbia Records singles
Corrosion of Conformity songs